The National Motorcycle Museum occupies an  site in Bickenhill, Solihull, England and holds the world's largest collection of British motorcycles. In addition to over 850 motorcycles, which cover a century of motorcycle manufacture, the museum has conference facilities. It is located close to the junction of the A45 and the M42, close to Birmingham Airport.

History

The founder of the museum, construction entrepreneur and self-made millionaire Roy Richards, started collecting good examples of British motorcycles in the 1970s. The museum opened in 1984 with an initial collection of 350 machines.

The museum was developed to include conference facilities in 1985. The museum has become the largest collection of British motorcycles in the world, with over 250,000 visitors a year.

2003 fire

The museum was severely damaged by a fire which broke out shortly before 5pm on 16 September 2003. West Midlands Fire Service investigators concluded that a cigarette thrown away in a designated smoking area was responsible for igniting a pile of cardboard boxes containing old air-conditioning filters. The fire spread very rapidly inside the museum's dropped ceilings which, though conforming to safety regulations, lacked a sprinkler system. The building did have smoke detection and fire alarm equipment which contacted the fire service within minutes of the fire starting, but the fire had taken a strong hold before it was discovered on site.

Fire crews were delayed by rush hour traffic and hindered by an inadequate hydrant on site, but the fire was extinguished after about an hour and a half. Many of the museum's rarest and irreplaceable exhibits were destroyed, with the loss of 380 motorcycles. The cost of the fire was estimated at over £14 million.

After fifteen months and a £20m rebuild which included installation of a £1.2m sprinkler system, the museum was reopened on 1 December 2004. 150 of the motorcycles that had been destroyed in the fire were fully restored for the re-opening. Many of the fire damaged motorcycles were restored to showroom condition.

2014 burglary
At about 11pm on 27 August 2014, burglars broke into the museum and stole more than 100 motorcycling competition trophies from a glass-fronted cabinet. The Museum offered a £20,000 reward for information leading to their recovery.

Exhibits
The museum is affiliated to the British Motorcycle Charitable Trust.

The motorcycles on display represent examples of well known makes, such as BSA, Triumph and Norton as well as less well known makers including Coventry-Eagle, Montgomery and New Imperial.

Golden Dream Brough

One of the most valuable motorcycles in the world the Brough Superior Golden Dream, which is the only example of George Brough's show model for the 1938 Olympia show. Hand-built by Brough and Freddie Dixon, the Golden Dream has two pairs of horizontally opposed cylinders, one above the other, with two longitudinal crankshafts to give vibration free running. The two crankshafts shafts are geared together, with one driving the rear wheel and the other driving the oil pump and magdyno. Two Brough Dream Fours were built but World War II stopped development. The second Brough Dream has a black and chrome finish and is in private ownership.

Wilkinson Luxury Tourer

Built by the Wilkinson Sword company before the First World War, the first Wilkinson motorcycles were aimed at military use. Optional accessories included a sidecar complete with Maxim gun, and a steering wheel instead of handlebars. The model displayed in the museum was built in 1912 and is the top-of-the-range four-cylinder water-cooled shaft drive version. Originally air-cooled, the Wilkinson TMC engine was water-cooled from 1911 and described as a ‘Luxury Touring Motor Cycle’.

See also
 Outline of motorcycles and motorcycling

References

External links

National Motorcycle Museum

1984 establishments in England
Buildings and structures in Solihull
Motorcycle museums in the United Kingdom
Museums in the West Midlands (county)
Transport museums in England